Greg Fee (born 24 June 1964) is an English former professional footballer who played as a central defender.

Career
Born in Halifax, Fee played for Bradford City, Kettering Town, Boston United, Sheffield Wednesday, Preston North End, Northampton Town, Leyton Orient, Mansfield Town, Chesterfield, Telford United, Emley, Gainsborough Trinity, Hucknall Town and Heanor Town.

He also had spells as player-manager of both Boston United and Gainsborough Trinity.

Personal life
Fee has a degree in mathematics.

References

1964 births
Living people
English footballers
Bradford City A.F.C. players
Kettering Town F.C. players
Boston United F.C. players
Sheffield Wednesday F.C. players
Preston North End F.C. players
Leyton Orient F.C. players
Mansfield Town F.C. players
Chesterfield F.C. players
Telford United F.C. players
Wakefield F.C. players
Gainsborough Trinity F.C. players
Hucknall Town F.C. players
Heanor Town F.C. players
English Football League players
Boston United F.C. managers
Gainsborough Trinity F.C. managers
Association football central defenders
English football managers